Inoel Navarro González (born 28 July 1987) is a Dominican footballer who plays as a forward. He is also a beach soccer player for Las Malvinas FC as a pivot, and represented the Dominican Republic internationally in both football and beach soccer.

International career

International goals
Scores and results list Dominican Republic's goal tally first.

References

External links
 
 

1987 births
Living people
Dominican Republic footballers
Dominican Republic international footballers
Association football forwards
Don Bosco FC players
Bauger FC players
Atlético Pantoja players
Universidad O&M FC players
Liga Dominicana de Fútbol players
Ligue Haïtienne players
Dominican Republic expatriate footballers
Dominican Republic expatriate sportspeople in Haiti
Expatriate footballers in Haiti
People from Hato Mayor del Rey
Dominican Republic under-20 international footballers
Beach soccer players